The Trials of Cato are a Welsh/English folk band that originally consisted of Tomos Williams, Will Addison and Robin Jones. Their 2018 debut album Hide and Hair won Best Album in the BBC Radio 2 Folk Awards in 2019. In 2020, Will Addison left the group, and was replaced by Polly Bolton, a mandolin player and vocalist known for her work with The Magpies and Stillhouse.

The original trio formed the band in Beirut while working there as English teachers after graduating university. After moving to Beirut, the band stayed with a friend named Cato, who did not especially enjoy their music, hence the name 'The Trials of Cato'.

They played at Celtic Connections 2022 as a support group for Sharon Shannon.

Their second album titled Gog Magog, after the giant of Arthurian legend and the Cambridgeshire hilltop, was released on 25th November 2022.

Discography 
Albums
 Hide and Hair (2018)
 Gog Magog (expected 2022)

Singles
 Gloria (2018)
 Bedlam Boys (2021)

EPs
 The Trials of Cato EP (2017)

References

External links 
 Official website
 The Trials of Cato Bandcamp Page

English folk musical groups
Welsh folk music
Musical groups established in 2018